Paganini or I Liked Kissing Women is a 1934 German operetta film directed by E. W. Emo and starring Iván Petrovich, Eliza Illiard, and Theo Lingen. It is an adaptation of Franz Lehár's 1925 operetta Paganini.

Cast

References

External links

1930s historical musical films
German historical musical films
1930s biographical films
German biographical films
Films of Nazi Germany
Films directed by E. W. Emo
Operetta films
Films based on operettas
Films set in the 19th century
Biographical films about musicians
German black-and-white films
Films about violins and violinists
Films about classical music and musicians
Cultural depictions of Niccolò Paganini
Tobis Film films
1930s German films